Should She Obey? is an American film released in 1917. It was produced by the Arizona Film Company of Chicago. George Siegmann directed and appears in the film. It is considered a lost film.

The plot about a man who becomes successful leading a mining business and his wife has moralistic overtones. A showgirl steals his love.

Barratt O'Hara served as president of Arizona Film Company.

Cast
 George A. Siegmann
Norbert Myles
Gene Genung
J. Webster Dill
Billie West
Andrew Arbuckle
Alice Wilson
James Harrison
Robert Lawlor
Herbert Sutch
Laura Winston
Margaret McQuarrie
Walter C. Howey

References

Lost American films
1917 films
Films directed by George Siegmann